Super Pop Venezuela is an album released by Venezuelan band Los Amigos Invisibles in 2005. It is made up entirely of covers of Venezuelan pop songs from the '60s to the early '90s.

Track listing
"Intro"
"Miss Venezuela"
"All Day Today"
"Curda Y Pan"
"Yo Soy Así"
"No Es Fácil Amar A Una Mujer"
"Rosario"
"Yo No Sé"
"Caramelo Y Chocolate"
"Amar Es Algo Más"
"Si Tú Te vas"
"Ganas"
"Dun Dun"
"Mao Mao"
"Un Poquito Más"
"Media Luna"
"Superpop Venezuela"
"San Agustín"

References

2006 albums
Los Amigos Invisibles albums